George Urquhart (born 22 April 1950) is a former footballer who played for St Mirren, Guildford City, Ross County, Wigan Athletic and Macclesfield Town.

He currently works as an agent for a number of high-profile footballers, including Antonio Valencia and Robbie Savage. In 2009, Urquhart was fined £500 by the FA for a breach in regulations relating to Savage's transfer to Derby County.

References

1950 births
Living people
Scottish footballers
Association football midfielders
St Mirren F.C. players
Guildford City F.C. players
Ross County F.C. players
Wigan Athletic F.C. players
Macclesfield Town F.C. players
English Football League players
British sports agents